The Cherry Picker is 1974 British drama film directed by Peter Curran and starring Lulu, Bob Sherman, Wilfrid Hyde-White, Spike Milligan, Patrick Cargill, Jack Hulbert, Fiona Curzon, Terry-Thomas and Robert Hutton. As of August 2010, the film is missing from the BFI National Archive, and is listed as one of the British Film Institute's "75 Most Wanted" lost films, due to the loss of the original print, though inferior quality copies are still in circulation. A VHS version of the movie has now been discovered and reuploaded on YouTube.

Cast
Nancy - Lulu
James Burn III - Bob Sherman
Appleby - Terry-Thomas
Dobson - Wilfrid Hyde-White
Mr. Lal - Spike Milligan
Dr. Harrison - Patrick Cargill
Sir Hugh Fawcett - Jack Hulbert
Maureen - Fiona Curzon
James Burn II - Robert Hutton
Mrs. Trulove - Priscilla Morgan
Dan Haydock - Arthur Blake
Vicar - Barry Wilsher
Dr. Softman - Bruce Boa
Pilkington - Henry McGee
Mrs. Lal - Marianne Stone
Dubbed Voice of Nancy - Nikki van der Zyl

References

External links 

1974 films
1974 drama films
British drama films
1970s rediscovered films
Rediscovered British films
1970s English-language films
1970s British films